Dominican Republic–United States relations are bilateral relations between the Dominican Republic and the United States of America.
There are around 200,000 Americans expats in the Dominican Republic, and a little over 2 million Dominicans live in the United States.

Overview
The country's standing as the largest Caribbean economy, second-largest country in terms of land mass, and third-largest in population, with large bilateral trade with (due to its proximity to) the United States and other smaller Caribbean nations make the Dominican Republic an important partner in hemispheric affairs. The Embassy estimates that 100,000 U.S. citizens live in the Dominican Republic, many of whom are dual nationals. An important element of the relationship between the two countries is the fact that more than 1 million individuals of Dominican origin reside in the United States; most of them live in the metropolitan Northeast, with some in Florida. In recent years, there has also been a large wave of migration from the Dominican Republic to neighboring Puerto Rico, a U.S. territory which has many cultural and historical ties to the Dominican Republic.

Under the purview of the Monroe Doctrine and American imperialism, US president Ulysses Grant unsuccessfully promoted a treaty to annex the Dominican Republic, which was up for debate in the US Congress from 1869 to 1871. The American idea to acquire Santo Domingo—dragged by political and economic instability since its separation from Haiti in 1844—traced back to 1854.

The U.S. occupied the Dominican Republic from 1916 until 1924 and intervened on behalf of the Dominican government during the 1965 Dominican Civil War.

The Dominican government has been supportive of many U.S. initiatives in the United Nations and related agencies. The two governments cooperate in the fight against the traffic in illegal substances. The Dominican Republic has worked closely with U.S. law enforcement officials on issues such as the extradition of fugitives and measures to hinder illegal migration.

The United States supported the Leonel Fernández administration's efforts to improve Dominican competitiveness, to attract foreign private investment, to fight corruption, and to modernize the tax system. Bilateral trade is important to both countries. U.S. firms, mostly manufacturers of apparel, footwear, and light electronics, as well as U.S. energy companies, account for much of the foreign private investment in the Dominican Republic.

Exports from the United States to the Dominican Republic in 2018 totaled US$8.9 billion, up 14% from the previous year. The Dominican Republic exported $5.3 billion to the United States in 2018. The U.S. Embassy works closely with U.S. business firms and Dominican trade groups, both of which can take advantage of the new opportunities in this growing market. At the same time, the Embassy is working with the Dominican government to resolve ongoing commercial and investment disputes.

The Embassy counsels U.S. firms through its Country Commercial Guide and informally via meetings with business persons planning to invest or already investing in the Dominican Republic. This is a challenging business environment for U.S. firms, especially for medium to smaller sized businesses.

The U.S. Agency for International Development (USAID) mission is focused on improving access of underserved populations to quality health care and combating HIV/AIDS and tuberculosis (TB), promoting economic growth through policy reform, support for CAFTA-DR implementation, and technical assistance to small producers and tourism groups; environmental protection and policy reform initiatives; improved access to quality primary, public education and assistance to at-risk youth; a model rural electrification program; and improving participation in democratic processes, while strengthening the judiciary and combating corruption across all sectors.

United States diplomatic missions
 Ambassador—Robert W. Thomas
 Deputy Chief of Mission—Christopher Lambert
 USAID Mission Director—James Watson, Acting
 Consul General—William Weissman
 Economic and Political Counselor—Alexander Marguiles
 Public Affairs Adviser—Todd Philip Haskell
 Commercial Counselor (DOC/FCS)—Robert O. Jones
 Defense Attaché—Lt. Col. David M. O'Connell (U.S. Marine Corps)

The U.S. Embassy is located in Santo Domingo.

Diplomatic missions

The Dominican Republic and the United States of America established diplomatic relations on March 26, 1884.

The Embassy of the Dominican Republic is located at 1715 22nd Street NW in the Kalorama neighborhood. She is the first female representative of the Dominican Republic to the United States Government. A native of the city of Santiago de los Caballeros, she was born on October 31, 1946. The Dominican Republic also maintains consulates in Boston, Chicago, Los Angeles, Miami, New York, New Orleans, San Juan and Mayaguez.

See also
 Dominican Americans
 Foreign relations of the United States
 Foreign relations of the Dominican Republic
United States involvement in regime change in Latin America

References

Further reading
 Ayala, César J. American sugar kingdom (Duke University Press, 2014).
 Braveboy-Wagner, Jacqueline, and Clifford Griffin. Historical Dictionary of United States-Caribbean Relations (Rowman & Littlefield, 2017).
 Duany, Jorge. "To send or not to send: Migrant remittances in Puerto Rico, the Dominican Republic, and Mexico." ANNALS of the American Academy of Political and Social Science 630.1 (2010): 205–223.  online
 Fatalski, Marcin. "The United States and the Fall of the Trujillo Regime." Ad Americam. Journal of American Studies 14 (2013): 7–18.
 Finley-Brook, Mary. "CAFTA-DR: diverging trajectories and uneven development." in Handbook of International Trade Agreements (Routledge, 2018) pp. 166–180.

 Hornbeck, John F. "The Dominican Republic-Central America-United States Free Trade Agreement (CAFTA DR): Developments in Trade and Investment." (2012). online
 Horne, Gerald. Confronting Black Jacobins: The US, the Haitian Revolution, and the Origins of the Dominican Republic (NYU Press, 2015).
 Motel, Seth, and Eileen Patten. "Hispanics of Dominican origin in the United States, 2010." (Pew Research Hispanic Trends Project, 2012) online.
 Munro, Dana G. The United States and the Caribbean Republics, 1921–1933 (1974) online
 Paton, John R. Intellectual and political resistance to the US occupation of the Dominican Republic–1916-1924 (The University of Maine, 2013).

External links
 History of Dominican Republic – U.S. relations
 Senior Embassy Officials | Embassy of the United States Dominican Republic

 
Bilateral relations of the United States
United States